Öykü Gürman (born 4 August 1982) is a Turkish singer and actress. In 2007, she and her twin brother formed the due Öykü ve Berk and released three albums until 2015. Ever since, she has pursued a solo music career and has worked as an actress.

Career 
Gürman studied at Private Efdal Kindergarten and Primary School and later at İstek Foundation Acıbadem High School. She graduated from Pera Fine Arts High School in 2001. In 2001, she continued her music education by taking violin and singing lessons at the Istanbul Technical University Turkish Music State Conservatory.

Gürman makes music by blending Mediterranean and Arabic musical elements. She and her brother rose to prominence by sharing a video of themselves on YouTube, in which they performed the song "Evlerinin Önü Boyalı Direk".

Their first album, Kısmet, has a total of 10 songs. In addition to the songs bearing Berk's signature, they blended famous türküs with flamenco elements and put them in the album. After these releases, they presented the music and chat program Boyalı Direk on TRT 1. In 2010, Öykü and Berk ended the duo, and decided to pursue a solo career.

Since 2014, she has shifted her focus to her acting career. She is best known for her role as Asiye in the drama series Sen Anlat Karadeniz, in which she starred between 2018 and 2019.

Discography

Albums

As Öykü ve Berk 
 Kısmet (2007) / Pasaj Müzik
 İki Arada (2009) / Pasaj Müzik

Solo 
 Bir Başka (2011) / Pasaj Müzik
 Rüya Bitti (2015) / Pasaj Müzik

Singles 
 "Nem Alacak Felek Benim" (2014)
 "Düşün Beni" (2018)
 "Ay Işığı" (with Koliva) (2019)
 "Deniz Gözlüm" (2020)
 "Yine Sevenler Sevsin" (2020)
 "Nació la Luna" (with Berk Gürman) (2021)

Filmography

References

External links 
 
 
 
 Öykü Gürman on Spotify

Living people
1982 births
Turkish singer-songwriters
Actresses from Istanbul
Turkish twins
Golden Butterfly Award winners
Turkish women singers